Kulithalai  is a  municipality in Karur district & Sub-urb of Tiruchirapalli City in the Indian state of Tamil Nadu. The recorded history of Kulithalai is known from Cheras, followed by medieval Chola period of the 9th century and has been ruled, at different times, by the Medieval Cholas, Later Cholas, Later Pandyas, Vijayanagar Empire and the British.

Kulithalai comes under the Kulithalai assembly constituency which elects a member to the Tamil Nadu Legislative Assembly once every five years and it is a part of the Perambalur (Lok Sabha constituency) which elects its Member of Parliament (MP) once in five years. As of 2011, the town had a population of 27,910. The town is a part of the fertile Cauvery delta region and agriculture is the major occupation. Roadways are the major mode of transportation to Kulithalai and the town also has rail connectivity.

Etymology and history
The town derives its name from the presiding deity of the Kadamba Vaneswarar temple. The 7th century Nayanmars (Saiva saints) Thirunavukkarasar, revered the place as Kadambandurai and Kuzhithandalai in his works in Tevaram. The word Kuzhithandalai, in modern times, is denoted as Kulithalai. As per Hindu legend, Saptha Matha, the seven divine virgins were praying to god Shiva in the Kadamba forest located here to save them from a demon named Doomralochana. Shiva is believed to have killed the demon to save the forest and the virgins, thereby getting the name Kadhambavaneshwarar, meaning the Lord of Kadamba Forest.

Geography & Climate
Kulithalai is located on the banks of Kaveri river. The topography is almost plain, with no major geological formation. There are no notable mineral resources available in and around the town. The soil types are alluvial and red that are conducive for common crops in the Cauvery delta. Like the rest of the state, April to June are the hottest months and December to January are the coldest. The South west monsoon, with an onset in June and lasting up to August, brings scanty rainfall. Bulk of the rainfall is received during the North East monsoon in the months of October, November and December. The average number of rainy days ranges from 35-40 every year.

Demographics

According to 2011 census, Kulithalai had a population of 27,910 with a sex-ratio of 1,016 females for every 1,000 males, much above the national average of 929. A total of 2,522 were under the age of six, constituting 1,313 males and 1,209 females. Scheduled Castes and Scheduled Tribes accounted for 16.77% and .4% of the population respectively. The average literacy of the town was 81.22%, compared to the national average of 72.99%. The town had a total of : 7374 households. There were a total of 10,844 workers, comprising 362 cultivators, 1,829 main agricultural labourers, 302 in house hold industries, 7,746 other workers, 605 marginal workers, 9 marginal cultivators, 215 marginal agricultural labourers, 21 marginal workers in household industries and 360 other marginal workers. There was a higher population growth during the decade of 1991. The gross population density of the town as of 2001 stood at 2,344 person per km2. As per the religious census of 2011, Kulithalai had 89.47% Hindus, 7.35% Muslims, 3.12% Christians, 0.02% Sikhs and 0.05% following other religions.

Residential areas make up 14.31per cent  of the town's total area while commercial enterprises and industrial units make up 1.2per cent and 0.17per cent respectively.

Economy and transportation
Agriculture and allied agro-based industries form the economic base of Kulithalai. There are house hold industries like gem cutting and  rice mills, oil mills and coir manufacturing units located along New Court Street and Manaparai Road. There are no major industries in the town. As of 2001, worker population constituted 37.6 per cent of the total population. Out of the total workforce, 7,034 constituting   71.58 per cent people were employed in tertiary sector, 1,707 people constituting 17.37 per cent were involved in primary sector, 58 people constituting 0.22 per cent were involved in secondary sector and 1,028 people constituting 10.46 per cent marginal workers. The town is a centre for trading for the surrounding villages, housing provisional stores, food grain stores, vegetable shops, hotels, markets and fertilizer shops.

The Kulithalai municipality maintains  of roads. The town has  concrete roads,  of black-topped roads,  of WBM roads and  earthen roads. The town is located in the National Highway NH 67 between Karur and Trichy. Kulithalai is served by town bus service, which provides connectivity within the town and the suburbs. Minibus service operated by private companies cater to the local transport needs. The bus stand is maintained by the municipality, which runs it on a rented site. It is located in the Karur Trichy main Road. The Tamil Nadu State Transport Corporation operates daily services connecting various cities to Kulithalai. The major inter city bus routes from the town are to cities like Trichy and Karur. Kulithalai railway station is located in the rail head from Trichy to Karur. There are daily express trains running on either sides connecting Kulithalai with cities like Coimbatore, Erode, Palakkad, Mangalore, Cochin and Mysore. There are also passenger trains running either side from Karur to Trichy.

Municipal administration and politics

The Kulithalai municipality has 24 wards and there is an elected councillor for each of those wards. The functions of the municipality are devolved into six departments: general administration/personnel, Engineering, Revenue, Public Health, city planning and Information Technology (IT). All these departments are under the control of a Municipal Commissioner who is the executive head. The legislative powers are vested in a body of 24 members, one each from the 24 wards. The legislative body is headed by an elected Chairperson assisted by a Deputy Chairperson.

Kulithalai comes under the Kulithalai assembly constituency and it elects a member to the Tamil Nadu Legislative Assembly once every five years. M. Karunanidhi, five time Chief Minister of Tamil Nadu and leader of Dravida Munnetra Kazhagam won his first legislative elections from Kulithatlai constituency in 1962. From the 1977 elections, All India Anna Dravid Munnetra Kazhagam (AIADMK) won the assembly seat four times (in 1984, 1991, 2001 and 2011 elections), twice by Dravida Munnetra Kazhagam (DMK, 1996 and 2006 elections) and once each by Communist Party of India (CPI, 1980 elections), and Indian National Congress (INC, 1977). The current MLA of the constituency is A.Pappasundaram from AIADMK.

After 2009 delimitation, Kulithalai is a part of the Perambalur (Lok Sabha constituency) – it has the following six assembly constituencies – Kulithalai, Perambalur, Lalgudi, Manachanallur, Thuraiyur and Musiri. The current Member of Parliament from the constituency is R.P. Marutharaja from the AIADMK.

Law and order in the town in maintained by the Kulithalai sub division of the Karur district of Tamil Nadu Police headed by a Deputy Superintendent. There are one police station in located in Old Court street.

Education and utility services
As of 2011, there were two government higher secondary schools, three middle school, three primary schools and fifteen other private schools in Kulithalai. Government Arts College, started in 2007, is the only college in the town. There is an ITI located in at Peralamman Kovil street. All the other nearest colleges are present in Karur and Trichy.

Electricity supply to Kulithalai is regulated and distributed by the Tamil Nadu Electricity Board (TNEB). The town along with its suburbs is a part of Tiruchirappalli Electricity Distribution Circle. Water supply is provided by the Kulithalai Municipality from borewells in Kaveri river through two over head tanks located in the town. In the period 2000–2001, a total of 70 lakh litres of water was supplied every day for households in the town. As per the municipal data for 2011, about 9 metric tonnes of solid waste were collected from Kulithalai every day by door-to-door collection and subsequently the source segregation and dumping was carried out by the sanitary department of the Kulithalai municipality. The coverage of solid waste management in the town by the municipality had an efficiency of 100% as of 2001. There is no underground drainage system in the town and the sewerage system for disposal of sullage is through septic tanks, open drains and public conveniences. As of 2011, there was one government hospital and 12 other private hospitals and clinics that take care of the health care needs of the citizens. As of 2011, the municipality maintained a total of 1,309 street lamps: 146 sodium lamps, 42 mercury vapour lamps, 1,037 tube lights, 35 ordinary lights and seven solar. The municipality operates two markets, namely the Weekly Market and Uzhavar Santhai that cater to the needs of the town and the rural areas around it.

Culture
Kadambar Kovil is an ancient Shiva temple located in the centre of the town. It is the second of the paadal petra Siva sthalams in the region. Built on the banks of river Cauvery, the temple has a tall gopuram (gateway tower) and the stone walls. The Thai Poosam festival held in the Tamil month of Thai is famous for the congregation of deities from the surrounding seven villages and attracts lot of visitors. The annual Mariamman Kovil Thiru Therr Vizha held in the temple is another prominent festival in the town. The fortnightly ritual culminates on the festive day when people perform their prayers and offerings through Theertha Kudam (water pot), Alagu (piercing body parts), Agni Chatti (fire pot) and Pookuli Midhithal (walking on fire).

Rathnagirinathar temple at ancient Rathinagiri, which is currently called as Iyermalai or Ayyarmalai or Aivar Malai is located at about  far from Kulithalai, southerly. This is the first Padal petra sthalam in the region. The Ratnagireeeswarar temple is built on a hillock reached by a flight of 1000+ steps while the Sivapureeswarar temple is at the foothills level. The idols of Siva and Ambal face each other in the Upadesa posture in the temple.

As per a legend, Vayu Bhaghvan and Adiseshan had a dispute to find out who is superior, to prove the superiority adiseshan encircled the Kailasam, Vayu tried to remove this encircle by creating santamarutham (Twister). Because of the santamarutham, 8 kodumudigal (parts) fell from Kailasam into 8 different places which are Thirugonamalai (Trincomalee, Sri Lanka), Thirukalahasti,  Thiruchiramalai rock fort, Thiruenkoimalai, Rajathagiri, Neerthagiri, Ratnagiri (Ayyar Malai), and Suwethagiri or Thirupangeeli.

Traditionally, it is considered auspicious to visit on the same day three padal petra sthalams - Kadambar Kovil at Kulithalai, Rathnagirinathar temple at Rathinagiri (now called Ayyarmalai) and Thiru Eengoi Malai at Mullipadi.

CSI Church, Amalarakkini Aalayam and Kulithalai Mosque are the other worship places.

Notes

Footnotes 
  The municipalities in Tamil Nadu are graded special, selection, grade I and grade II based on income and population. While "grade II" is the official classification, all the municipal websites use "second grade".

Citations

References

External links

Cities and towns in Karur district